The  is an oil-on-canvas painting by the French Neoclassical artist . It was painted between 1851 and 1853, and shows , who adopted the courtesy title 'Princesse'. Born , she married , the future 28th Prime Minister of France, in 1845.  was 28 at the time of the painting's completion. She was highly intelligent and widely known for her beauty, but she suffered from profound shyness and the painting captures her melancholia.  contracted tuberculosis in her early 30s and died in 1860 aged 35. Although  lived until 1901, he was heartbroken and did not remarry.

 undertook a number of preparatory pencil sketches for the commission, each of which captures her personality and taste. They show her in various poses, including standing, and in differently styled dresses. As with many of 's portraits of women, details of the costume and setting are rendered with precision while the body seems to lack a solid bone structure. The painting is held in the collection of the Metropolitan Museum of Art, New York, and is signed and dated 1853.

Commission

 (1825–1860) married Albert, 4th Duke de Broglie on 18 June 1845, and they had five sons together. On the occasion of their marriage, they styled themselves 'Princesse' and 'Prince' respectively, due the former title of 'Prince of the Holy Roman Empire' granted to the House of Broglie (1759).  was a highly intelligent and religious woman, who was well read and wrote a number of texts over her lifetime.
 approached  around 1850 to undertake the portrait.  dined with the  family in January 1850, and according to one eyewitness, "seemed to be very happy with his model".

Although 's chief source of income came from portraiture, it distracted from his main interest in history painting, which early in his career, was far less lucrative. He found acclaim in the 1840s, when he became successful enough to no longer depend on commissions. This painting was 's second-last female portrait, and final society portrait. Influenced by the working methods of  began with a number of nude preparatory sketches, for which he employed professional models. He built up a picture of the sitter's underlying anatomical structure, as seen in the  study, before deciding how to build the lavish costume and accessories. Although there is no surviving record of the commission, and the exact sequence of events is uncertain, the sketches can be dated from 1850, the year the style of her evening dress came into fashion.  signed and dated the final picture at the left center "J. INGRES. pit 1853".

 died in 1860 aged 35 from tuberculosis. After her death,  published three volumes of her essays on religious history.  (who, in 1873, became the 28th Prime Minister of France) lived until 1901, but was heartbroken and did not remarry. He kept her portrait for the remainder of his life draped in fabric and hidden behind a velvet curtain, lending it only to select exhibitions. After his death, the painting passed within the family until 1958 when it was sold to the Metropolitan Museum of Art via the banker and art collector Robert Lehman, and is today held in the Lehman Wing. The family kept most of the jewelry and accessories seen in the painting, although the marabou feathers were sold to the Costume Institute of the Metropolitan Museum.

Preparatory studies

There are comparatively few extant preparatory sketches for the  painting compared to other of his later period portraits. 's usual technique was to use sketches both to plot the final work and to provide guidance for assistants on whom he relied to paint in the less important passages. Some others have been lost or destroyed.

The extant sketches date from 1850 to 1853 and are drawn with graphite on paper or tracing paper. They vary in elaboration and detail, but show  thinking through the eventual form and pose of the sitter. The earliest consists of a brief sketch of the princess in a seated pose. There is a full-length study of a nude standing in essentially the final pose, in which  experimented with two different positions of the crossed arms. A second full-length study shows a clothed figure. Two others are focused on her hands. A highly finished drawing of the princess standing with her left hand at the neck and dressed in a simpler costume than in the painting, may be a study for the painting or an independent work. Besides these five or six extant sketches, about the same number are known to be lost.

The painting's central motifs were already established in the earliest studies, in which her oval face, arched eyebrows, and habit of folding her arms with one stuffed into the opposing sleeve appear.  found the sittings difficult and agonised over every detail.

Description

The  is shown in three-quarters view, her arms resting on a lavishly upholstered, pale gold damask easy chair. Her head is tilted to the viewer's left, and her black hair tightly pulled back and bound by blue satin ribbons. She is pictured in the family home at 90  in Paris, in an evening dress that implies she is about to go out for the evening. She is dressed in the height of contemporary Parisian fashion, in particular the opulent Second Empire fashions then current in clothing, jewelry and furniture. She wears a gold embroidered evening shawl, and an off-the-shoulder, pale blue satin hoop skirt gown, with short sleeves and a lace and ribbon trim, highly emblematic of 1850s evening dress. Her hair is covered with a sheer frill trimmed with matching blue ribbon knots, and is swept back with a centre parting.

Her adornments include a necklace, tasseled earrings and bracelets on each wrist. Her earrings are made from cascades of small natural pearls. Her left wrist has a bracelet of roped pearls; the one on her right is made of enameled red and diamond set gold links. The necklace is held by a double looped chain holding a gold pendant, which appears to be an original Roman bulla.

As with all of 's portraits of women, her body seems to lack a solid bone structure. Her neck is unusually elongated, and her arms seem boneless or dislocated, while her left forearm appears to be under modeled and lacking in musculature. Her oval face and her expression are idealised, lacking the level of detail given to other foreground elements, although she was widely known as a great beauty.

The painting is composed of gray, white, blue, yellow and gold hues. The costume and decor are painted with a supreme precision, crispness and realism that art historians have compared to the work of Jan van Eyck. In many ways the painting is austere; art historian Robert Rosenblum describes a "glassy chill", and "astonishing chromatic harmonies that, for exquisite, silvery coolness, are perhaps only rivaled by Vermeer". Her facial features are statuesque and in places display the quality of porcelain. There are horizontal bands about 2.5cm wide in yellow paint on either side of her head near the earrings. They seem to have been used to plot the positioning of the moldings. The black hat on the chair seems to have been a late addition. There are visible passages of underdrawing where the artist seems to trace out shapes and positions, established in the preparatory sketches, onto the grounded canvas. These include squared lines around the left shoulder and chest areas. There are lines mapping out the throat and top edge of the bodice.

The grey wall is underlined with a barely discernible deep blue pigment. This minimalist approach reflects the "ascetic elegance" of his early female portraits, where the sitter was often set against featureless backdrops. The precisely rendered details and geometric background create an impression of immobility, though subtle movement is implied by the tilt of her head and the shimmering folds of her dress.

The current frame measures 157× 125.6cm at the exterior and is made of pink-orange pine, lined with a garland of gilt-plastered ornament flowers. Its ornaments lie on ovolo molding. It was produced in the United States between 1950 and 1960 (around the time the Metropolitan acquired the work) in the French Louis XIII style fashionable in 's period. The original  plaster frame was made in 1860 at the latest, and is thought to have been similar to the current one.

Reception

One critic wrote that the painting showed  as "refined, delicate, elegant to her finger tips... a marvelous incarnation of nobility." In general, it is held in the same high regard as 's , and Portrait of Baronne de Rothschild.

The work was an instant critical and popular success, and widely admired and written about. Most critics understood the artfulness of physical deformations, although one writer, writing under the byline A. de. G., and representing a minority, academic view, describes her as a "puny, wilted, sickly, woman; her thin arms rest on an armchair placed in front of her. M.  has rendered in an unheard-of manner these large, veiled eyes, deprived of sight. He has given this face a negative expression that he must have seen in real life, and reproduced it with a sure touch." The majority of critics noted 's attention to detail in describing her clothes, accessories and decor, and saw an artist at the height of his creativity, with a few invoking the precision of van Eyck. Some writers detected a hint of melancholy in de Broglie's eyes and expression.

References

Notes

Sources

 Betzer, Sarah. Ingres and the Studio: Women, Painting, History. University Park, PA: Pennsylvania State University Press, 2002. 
 Brettell, Richard; Hayes Tucker, Paul; Henderson Lee, Natalie. The Robert Lehman Collection III. Nineteenth and Twentieth-Century Paintings. New York: Metropolitan Museum of Art, 2009. 
 Davies, Martin. "An Exhibition of Portraits by Ingres and His Pupils". The Burlington Magazine for Connoisseurs, volume 64, no. 374, 1934
 Hale, Charlotte; "Technical Observations". In: Bertin, Eric; Tinterow, Gary. 'Portraits by Ingres: Image of an Epoch': Reflections, Technical Observations, Addenda, and Corrigenda. Metropolitan Museum Journal, volume 35, 2000
 Marandel, Patrice. Europe in the Age of Enlightenment and Revolution. Metropolitan Museum of Art, 1987. 
 McConnell, Sophie. Metropolitan Jewelry. New York: Metropolitan Museum of Art, 1991
 Naef, Hans. "Eighteen Portrait Drawings by Ingres". Master Drawings, volume 4, no. 3, 1966. 
 Newbery, Timothy. Frames in the Robert Lehman Collection. NY: Metropolitan Museum of Art Publications, 2007. 
 Rosenblum, Robert. Ingres. London: Harry N. Abrams, 1990. 
 Taylor, Lou. The Study of Dress History. Manchester: Manchester University Press, 2002. 
 Tinterow, Gary. Portraits by Ingres: Image of an Epoch. New York: Metropolitan Museum of Art, 1999. 
 Tucker, Paul. Nineteenth- And Twentieth-Century Paintings in The Robert Lehman Collection. New York: Metropolitan Museum of Art, 2009. 
 Wolohojian, Stephan. "A Private Passion: 19th-Century Paintings and Drawings from the Grenville L. Winthrop Collection, Harvard University". New York: Metropolitan Museum of Art, 2003.

External links
 MET catalogue entry
 Smarthistory video (Khan Academy)

1851 paintings
1853 paintings
Portraits by Jean-Auguste-Dominique Ingres
Paintings in the collection of the Metropolitan Museum of Art
Portraits of women